British protectorates were protectorates - or client states - under protection of the British Empire's armed forces and represented by British diplomats in international arenas, such as the Great Game, in which the Emirate of Afghanistan and the Tibetan Kingdom became  protected states for short periods of time. Many territories which became British protectorates already had local rulers with whom the Crown negotiated through treaty, acknowledging their status whilst simultaneously offering protection, e.g. British Paramountcy. British protectorates were therefore governed by indirect rule. In most cases, the local ruler, as well as the subjects of the indigenous ruler were not British subjects. British protected states represented a more loose form of British suzerainty, where the local rulers retained absolute control over the states' internal affairs and the British exercised control over defence and foreign affairs.

Implementation
When the British took over Cephalonia in 1809, they proclaimed, "We present ourselves to you, Inhabitants of Cephalonia, not as invaders, with views of conquest, but as allies who hold forth to you the advantages of British protection." When the British continued to occupy the Ionian Islands after the Napoleonic wars, they did not formally annex the islands but described them as a protectorate. The islands were constituted by the Treaty of Paris in 1815 as the independent United States of the Ionian Islands under British protection. Similarly, Malta was a British protectorate between the capitulation of the French in 1800 and the Treaty of Paris of 1814.

The princely states of India was another example of indirect rule during the time of Empire. So too were many of the West African holdings.

Other British protectorates followed. The Royalist also visited each of the Ellice Islands, and Captain Davis was requested by islanders to raise the British flag, but he did not have instructions to declare the Ellice Islands as a protectorate.

In 1894, Prime Minister William Ewart Gladstone's government officially announced that Uganda, where Muslim and Christian strife had attracted international attention, was to become a British Protectorate. The British administration installed carefully selected local kings under a program of indirect rule through the local oligarchy, creating a network of British-controlled civil service. Most British protectorates were overseen by a Commissioner or a High Commissioner, rather than a Governor.

British law makes a distinction between a protectorate and a protected state. Constitutionally the two are of similar status, in which Britain provides controlled defence and external relations. However, a protectorate has an internal government established, while a protected state establishes a form of local internal self-government based on the already existing one.

Persons connected with a former British protectorate, protected state, mandated territory or trust territory may remain British Protected Persons if they did not acquire the nationality of the country at independence.

The last British protectorate proper was the British Solomon Islands, now Solomon Islands, which gained independence in 1978; the last British protected state was Brunei, which gained full independence in 1984.

List of former British protectorates

Americas

 Barbados (1627–1652) (as a proprietary colony under William Courteen, followed by James Hay I)
 (1655–1860) (over Central America's Miskito Indian nation)

Arab world
 Aden Protectorate (1872–1963); precursor state of South Yemen
Eastern Protectorate States (mostly in Haudhramaut); later the Protectorate of South Arabia (1963–1967)
 Kathiri
 Mahra
 Qu'aiti
 Upper Yafa (consisted of five Sheikhdoms: Al-Busi, Al-Dhubi, Hadrami, Maflahi, and Mawsata)
 Hawra
 Irqa
Western Protectorate States; later the Federation of South Arabia (1959/1962-1967), including Aden Colony
 Wahidi Sultanates (these included: Balhaf, Azzan, Bir Ali, and Habban)
 Beihan
 Dhala and Qutaibi
 Fadhli
 Lahej
 Lower Yafa
 Audhali
 Haushabi
 Upper Aulaqi Sheikhdom
 Upper Aulaqi Sultanate
 Lower Aulaqi
 Alawi
 Aqrabi
 Dathina
 Shaib
  Sultanate of Egypt (1914–1922)
   Anglo-Egyptian Sudan (1899–1956) (condominium with Egypt)

Asia
 Cis-Sutlej states (1809–1947)
  Maldive Islands (1887–1948)
 (1861–1947)

Europe
 British Cyprus (1871–1914) (put under British military administration 1914–22 then proclaimed a Crown colony 1922–60)
  Malta Protectorate (1800–1813);  Crown Colony of Malta proclaimed in 1813) (de jure part of the Kingdom of Sicily but under British protection)
  Ionian islands (1815–1864) (a Greek state and amical protectorate of Great Britain between 1815 and 1864)

Sub-Saharan Africa
 Protectorate (1900–1964)
 Bechuanaland Protectorate (1885–1966)
 (1884–1960)
 East Africa Protectorate (1895–1920)
 Gambia Colony and Protectorate* (1894–1965)
 Kenya Protectorate* (1920–1963)
 Nigeria* (1914-1960)
 Northern Nigeria Protectorate (1900–1914)
 (1924–1964)
 Northern Territories of the Gold Coast (British protectorate) (1901–1957)
 Nyasaland Protectorate (1893–1964) ( British Central Africa Protectorate until 1907)
 Sierra Leone Protectorate* (1896–1961)
 Southern Nigeria Protectorate (1900–1914)
 Swaziland (1902–1967)
 Uganda Protectorate (1894–1962)
 Walvis Bay (1878–1884)
 (1890–1963)
*protectorates which existed alongside a colony of the same name

Oceania
 (1884–1888)
 British Solomon Islands (1893–1978)
 Cook Islands (1888–1901)
 (1892–1916)
 Niue (1900–1901)
 Tokelau (1877–1916)

List of former British protected states 
As protected states, the following states were never officially part of the British Empire and retained near-total control over internal affairs; however, the British controlled their foreign policy. Their status was rarely advertised while it was in effect, it becoming clear only after it was lifted.

 (1888–1984)
 (1910–1947)
 (1879–1919)
 (1816–1923)
 (1904–1910; 1912–1921)
 (1922–1936)
 Federation of Malaya (1948–1957)
 (1895–1946)
 (1888–1895)
 Sungai Ujong (1874–1888)
 Jelebu (1886–1895)
 (1888–1895)
 (1874–1895)
 (1874–1895)
 Unfederated Malay States (1904/09–1946)
 (1914–1946)
 Muar (1897–1909)
 (1909–1946)
 Kulim (1894–1909)
 (1909–1946)
 (1909–1946)
 (1919–1946)
  (1900–1970)
  British Residency of the Persian Gulf (1822–1971); headquarters based at Bushire, Persia
 Persia (1919–1921)
 (1880–1971)
 Sheikhdom of Kuwait (1899–1961)
 Qatar (1916–1971)
; precursor state of the UAE (1892–1971)
 Abu Dhabi (1820–1971)
 Ajman (1820–1971)
 Dubai (1835–1971)
 Fujairah (1952–1971)
 Ras Al Khaimah (1820–1971)
 Sharjah (1820–1971)
 Kalba (1936–1951)
 Umm al-Qaiwain (1820–1971)
 (1892–1970) (informal)
 (1888–1946)
  North Borneo (1888–1946)
  Maldive Islands (1948-1965)
 Swaziland (1967–1968)

References

Bibliography
 

British Empire
Protectorate
History of the Commonwealth of Nations